The 2021 Boost Mobile Super Trucks Series was the second season for the Boost Mobile Super Trucks, an Australian off-road racing series that serves as a counterpart to the Stadium Super Trucks in the United States. Held over three race weekends, the season began at Symmons Plains Raceway on 17–18 April. The series supported Supercars Championship race weekends.

The COVID-19 pandemic resulted in multiple rounds being cancelled. Paul Morris and Shae Davies were tied for the most points accumulated across the three remaining weekends, though Morris won four races to Davies' two for the tiebreaker.

After the season, the trucks were returned to America after the series failed to renew its partnership with Supercars, who were under new ownership. However, new Supercars CEO Shane Howard expressed his interest in bringing them back for 2023.

Drivers

Schedule
Much of the 2020 season's schedule was lost to the COVID-19 pandemic, leading to only the season-opening Adelaide 500 being run.

The first confirmed race of 2021 was the Darwin Triple Crown, which was announced in November 2020, in the trucks' first race there since 2017. In March 2021, Speedcafe spoke with series manager Nathan Cayzer, who confirmed a seven-round schedule supporting the Supercars Championship. A Boost Mobile Super Trucks weekend consists of three races, with the first on one day while the other two take place the following day.

Restrictions in response to the pandemic resulted in the Perth SuperNight (originally scheduled for 11–12 September), Auckland SuperSprint (6–7 November), and Gold Coast 500 (4–5 December) being cancelled. The Sydney SuperNight was initially postponed from 21–22 August to 19–21 November before being changed to a four-weekend stretch for the Supercars. Although Supercars CEO Sean Seamer indicated his hope for the trucks to support a round at Sydney, no races took place.

Races cancelled due to the COVID-19 pandemic

Season summary
The season-opening weekend at Symmons Plains Raceway supported the Tasmania SuperSprint; the weekend was initially planned for 10–11 April before being postponed by a week due to COVID-related travel restrictions. The six drivers for the weekend included two newcomers in Nash Morris, the son of Paul Morris, and Dave Casey, who tested a truck in 2020; however, the younger Morris missed the first race due to back pain and was relieved by Russell Ingall for the rest of the weekend. Paul Morris won two of the first three races while Shae Davies won the third.

The second weekend at the Darwin Triple Crown saw the returns of Greg Gartner (raced in 2020), Travis Milburn (last raced in 2018), and Rob Whyte (last start in 2016). Paul Weel flipped in the first race after contact with Casey resulted in a poor ramp entry, leading to a one-lap run to the finish as Paul Morris passed Gartner for the win; Morris also won the second race. A healthy Nash Morris, making his debut in a truck originally arranged for Craig Dontas, dominated the third before Davies overtook him in the final chicane as the two approached the finish.

Toby Price began the Reid Park Street Circuit weekend by winning his first career race in his season debut. Weel won the rest of the weekend's races for his maiden victories.

The cancellation of the Gold Coast 500 and exclusion from the Supercars' Sydney tripleheader quietly ended the Boost Mobile Super Trucks season. No season-long standings were properly tracked by the series (though weekend points were kept), though Morris and Davies were mathematically tied for the lead with 93 points apiece; Morris claimed the tiebreaker as he had four wins to Davies' two.

Results and standings

Race results

Drivers' championship

Driver replacements

Notes

References

Boost